The Preparation Series was a South African rugby union tournament organised by SA Rugby. The tournament was used to be a number of preparation fixtures were announced by SA Rugby.

Although there was no trophy for this tournament, the  ended up in top spot in Pool A and the  topped in pool B.

Regular season

Format
The eight teams have been split into two groups and will play cross-pool matches. Each team played four matches. Two at home and two away. The tournament spanned from Friday, 26 February until Sunday, 28 March.

Standings

Pool A

Pool B

Matches

Round 1

Round 2

Round 3

Round 4

Player statistics

See also
 2021 British & Irish Lions Tour to South Africa
 Pro14 Rainbow Cup

References

Preparation Series
Preparation Series